Ullsfjord is a former municipality in Troms county in Norway.  The  municipality existed from 1902 until its dissolution in 1964.  It was located in what is now the eastern part of Tromsø Municipality and the southwestern part of Lyngen Municipality.  The municipality encompassed the area surrounding the Ullsfjorden between Tromsø and Lyngen.  The administrative centre was the village of Sjursnes where Ullsfjord Church is located.

Name

The municipality was originally named Sørfjord from 1902 until 1938.  This literally translates as "the southern fjord" (a branch of the larger Ullsfjorden).  In 1938, the name of the municipality was changed to Ullsfjord, after the name of the nearby Ullsfjorden.  The municipality's new name literally means the fjord of Ullr, a god from ancient Germanic paganism.

History
The municipality of Sørfjord was established on 1 January 1902 when Lyngen Municipality was divided in two:  the western part (population: 1,139) became the municipality of Ullsfjord and the eastern part (population: 5,102) remained as Lyngen.

During the 1960s, there were many municipal mergers across Norway due to the work of the Schei Committee.  On 1 January 1964, the municipality ceased to exist and its land was divided as follows:
The Svensby area (population: 171) was merged with the old Lyngen Municipality (population: 2,761) and all of the mainland parts of the old Karlsøy Municipality (population: 1,001) for form a new, larger Lyngen Municipality.
The rest of what was Ullsfjord (population: 2,019) was merged with the city of Tromsø (population: 12,602), the municipality of Tromsøysund (population: 16,727), and the parts of Hillesøy municipality on the island of Kvaløya (population: 1,316) to form a new, larger Tromsø Municipality.

Government

Municipal council
The municipal council  of Ullsfjord was made up of 17 representatives that were elected to four year terms.  The party breakdown of the final municipal council was as follows:

See also
List of former municipalities of Norway

References

External links

Tromsø
Lyngen
Former municipalities of Norway
1902 establishments in Norway
1964 disestablishments in Norway